Lake Te-jec-na is a small lake northeast of Old Forge in Herkimer County, New York. Lake Kan-ac-to is located south.

See also
 List of lakes in New York

References 

Te-jec-na
Te-jec-na